Carrick Pursuivant of Arms is a Scottish pursuivant of arms of the Court of the Lord Lyon.

The title is derived from the Earldom of Carrick, one of the titles borne by Robert the Bruce before his succession to the crown.  The arms of the Earldom are Argent, a chevron Gules, hence the chevron in the pursuivant's badge. The earliest known reference to the office is from 1364.

The badge is blazoned: A chevron Gules enfiled of a coronet of four fleurs-de-lys (two visible) and four crosses pattee (one and two halves visible) Or.

Holders of the office

See also
Officer of Arms
Pursuivant
Court of the Lord Lyon
Heraldry Society of Scotland

References

External links
The Court of the Lord Lyon



Court of the Lord Lyon
Offices of arms